Afra Koti or Afra Kati may refer to:
 Afra Koti, Babol
 Afra Kati va Lu Kola, Babol County
 Afra Koti-ye Mir Ali Tabar, Babol County
 Afra Koti, Qaem Shahr
 Afra Koti, Bisheh Sar, Qaem Shahr County